Janet Elizabeth Douglas CMG (born 1960) is a retired British diplomat who was the British High Commissioner to Barbados and the East Caribbean from 2017 to 2020.

Consular career
Douglas joined the Foreign and Commonwealth Office (FCO) in 1985 and was first made Desk Officer for Greece. In 1986, she was moved to the Directorate General of the European Commission. From 1987 to 1988, Douglas underwent Turkish training before being posted to the embassy in Ankara.

In 1991, she was made the Head of the Humanitarian Affairs Section and later joined the Emergency Aid Policy and Emergency Preparedness unit of the FCO. In 1996, Douglas was made the First Secretary of the European Union office in Stockholm and in 2000, the Deputy Department head of the Southern Africa Directorate at the FCO.

From 2002 to 2004, Douglas headed various internal bodies at the FCO and 2004 became the head of the Consular Assistance Group. She was appointed Commander of the Order of St Michael and St George in recognition of her work in the role in the 2008 New Year's Honours list.

From 2011 to 2017, Douglas was the Deputy Head of Mission in Ankara until she was appointed British High Commissioner to Barbados and the East Caribbean in April 2017. Douglas retired from the Diplomatic Service in December 2020, being succeeded by Scott Furssedonn-Wood in April 2021.

Personal life
Douglas is married to Tony Furlong and has two step children. She can speak French, Swedish and Turkish.

References

Living people
High Commissioners of the United Kingdom to Barbados
Alumni of St Catharine's College, Cambridge
1960 births
British women ambassadors
Members of HM Diplomatic Service
British civil servants
High Commissioners of the United Kingdom to Antigua and Barbuda
High Commissioners of the United Kingdom to Dominica
High Commissioners of the United Kingdom to Grenada
High Commissioners of the United Kingdom to Saint Kitts and Nevis
High Commissioners of the United Kingdom to Saint Lucia
High Commissioners of the United Kingdom to Saint Vincent and the Grenadines
20th-century British diplomats